The 2009-10 Bundesliga season was the 111th in Hoffenheim's history and second consecutive season in the Bundesliga. They finished in eleventh, accumulating a total of 42 points over 34 games.

First-team squad
Squad at end of season

Transfers

Summer

In

Out

Winter

Out

Competitions

Overview

Bundesliga

League table

Results summary

Results by round

Matches

DFB-Pokal

Statistics

Appearances and goals 

|-
 ! colspan=14 style=background:#dcdcdc; text-align:center| Goalkeepers

 
 
 
|-
 ! colspan=14 style=background:#dcdcdc; text-align:center| Defenders

 
 
 
 
 
 
 
 
 
 
 
|-
 ! colspan=14 style=background:#dcdcdc; text-align:center| Midfielders

 
 
 
 
 
 
 
|-
 ! colspan=14 style=background:#dcdcdc; text-align:center| Forwards

 
 
 
 
 
 
 
 
|-

References

TSG 1899 Hoffenheim seasons
TSG 1899 Hoffenheim